The River City Brass Band (River City Brass, RCB) is a modified British-style brass band based in Pittsburgh, Pennsylvania. The twenty-eight-piece ensemble tours extensively throughout the United States and performs more than thirty-five concerts each year as part of its community concert series in Western Pennsylvania.

It received a standing ovation from a crowd of one thousand after making its public debut at the Carnegie Music Hall in Pittsburgh's Oakland neighborhood on Saturday evening, November 21, 1981 during Pittsburgh's British Festival.

Within six years of its founding, this ensemble had "gained a national reputation as one of America's most popular touring attractions," according to the Elmira Star-Gazette, and, by the mid-1990s, was known as "one of America's premier brass ensembles."

Ensemble history
 Building upon the long-standing tradition of brass bands popularized in Great Britain and the United States, the River City Brass (RCB) is staffed by twenty-five brass players and three percussionists. RCB differs from most brass bands, however, in that its instrumentation has been altered. French Horns are used instead of alto horns, and an Eb soprano trumpet is employed in place of a soprano cornet, creating a lighter, brighter, more "orchestral" sound than the traditional brass band.

On November 21, 1981, the RCB performed under the baton of conductor Robert Bernat at the Carnegie Music Hall in Pittsburgh during its inaugural concert. Among the performers during that first RCB concert were British musicians Robert Childs, a renowned euphonium performer with the Grimethorpe Colliery Band, and Arthur Taylor, a British brass band concert producer who served as the master of ceremonies for the RCB event. Enid Hattersley, then lord mayor of Sheffield, England, Pittsburgh's sister city, also participated, and was described by one area newspaper as "feisty and funny."

Since that time, the ensemble has been a featured performer at the Adelaide Festival of the Arts (Australia), Musikfest (Pennsylvania), Chautauqua Institution (New York), New Zealand International Festival of the Arts, Interlochen Center for the Arts (Michigan), and Thalian Hall (North Carolina), among many other venues across the United States and world.

According to the ensemble's website, “The mission of the River City Brass is to propagate and perpetuate musical culture, primarily American musical culture, across a broad spectrum of the public through the presentation of brass band performances, educational programs and the production of recordings. The River City Brass has as its central obligation service to the people of Western Pennsylvania.”

To that end, River City Brass members have operated a youth program since 1986. Known as the River City Youth Brass Band, it enables young musicians to hone their craft under the close supervision of professional players.

Since August 2010, the River City Brass has been led by internationally renowned tuba soloist and British conductor, James Gourlay.

Musical directors
1981-1994 Robert Bernat
1994-2009 Denis Colwell
2010–Present James Gourlay

Band members
One of the band's founding members was cornetist Joseph Murphy, a nuclear physicist at Westinghouse. A list of the principal band members of the River City Brass Band as of 2021 includes:

References

External links
 River City Brass Band

Musical groups from Pittsburgh
American brass bands
Musical groups established in 1981
Summit Records artists